Dynamo-Altay is an ice hockey team in Barnaul, Russia. They play in the Supreme Hockey League Championship, the third level of ice hockey in Russia. The club was founded in 2006.

External links
 Official site

Ice hockey teams in Russia